Sarekoppa Vasanth Kumar (Kumar Bangarappa) (born 28 September 1963) is an Indian actor and politician from Karnataka.

Career
Kumar Bangarappa is an Indian actor in Kannada films, known as the Action Hero of the late 80s and 90s. He is known for the action, stunts that he used to perform and his love for animals which are portrayed in his most famous movie Ashwamedha. He was the youngest member of the legislature as well as the youngest minister of Karnataka state in former Chief Minister of Karnataka S. M. Krishna's cabinet .

Personal life

Kumar Bangarappa was born on 28 September 1963 to S. Bangarappa, former Chief Minister of Karnataka and Shakuntala. He married Vidyullatha and has a son Arjun Bangarappa and a daughter Lavanya, Son Arjun has completed his civil Engineering and has been getting many offers for acting since a very young age and will be debuting in 2021.Daughter Lavanya has completed her Biomedical Engineering.

Politics

He entered politics dramatically in 1996 after a stint as a film actor donning lead roles in many Kannada films, when he was asked to contest the by-election to fill the vacancy in the Soraba constituency of Shimoga district - which his father represented from 1967 to 1994 - seven times in a row - till he got elected to the Lok Sabha, making way for his son. He was elected to Legislative Assembly of Karnataka in the Karnataka Congress Party, a regional political party founded by his father in 1994 after he was asked to resign as Chief Minister.

He was again elected from the same assembly constituency in 1999 as a Congress candidate after the merger of Karnataka Congress Party with Congress for second-term. He won as MLA from Soraba constituency on INC for third-term successively in 2004 election. He was inducted into S.M. Krishna government as minister of state for Municipal Administration (Independent Charge). Prior to that, he also worked as Minister of State for Minor Irrigation. For a few days, he resigned Indian National Congress party and joined Bharatiya Janata Party (BJP) for 20 days to revert Congress again.

He lost in the 2008 election on the Congress ticket, including his brother - Madhu Bangarappa on Samajwadi Party ticket, to Hartalu Halappa from BJP.

He is now elected as the Member of the Legislative Assembly (MLA) in the Government of Karnataka for the 2018 Legislative Assembly from the Bharatiya Janata Party (BJP), he won by defeating his brother Madhu Bangarappa by a huge margin of 13,500 votes by getting 72,000 votes.

Family feud and a rift
He entered politics as a stranger from the film industry without wielding any influence, even when his father was Chief Minister; however, a rift in the family developed ahead of the 2004 elections, when his younger brother Madhu Bangarappa wanted to contest only from Soraba and not from any other constituency even when the family did not want him to upsurge a family rift, on promise father S Bangarappa had to go against the wish of people and Kumar Bangarappa taking stance for the younger son Madhu. While Kumar stayed away from politics for a few weeks thousands of people wanted him to contest and on the request of them he had to make a political decision to contest against his own brother on a congress ticket while Madhu on the BJP ticket, and retained the seat with a huge margin of 24,000 votes, it was the first time that S. Bangarappa was defeated though his own son had won. At one stage, he even resigned Congress and left his minister of state portfolio to join BJP as per the directions of his father and returned to Congress soon when he felt uncomfortable in the BJP camp, bringing the family feud matters into 
the open public. The family feud grew till Bangarappa and both his sons lost the elections, including the continuance of disturbances between both the brothers during the family ritual celebrations after the death of S. Bangarappa.

Filmography
All films are in Kannada, unless otherwise noted.

Notes

External links
 Apoorva Jodi (1993) - Starring: Kumar Bangarappa, Heera - on YouTube

1963 births
Indian male film actors
Male actors in Kannada cinema
Living people
People from Shimoga
Bharatiya Janata Party politicians from Karnataka
Indian National Congress politicians from Karnataka
Male actors from Bangalore
Indian actor-politicians
Karnataka MLAs 2004–2007
Lok Sabha members from Karnataka
Male actors in Telugu cinema
20th-century Indian male actors
21st-century Indian male actors
Karnataka MLAs 2018–2023